Interstate 66 (I-66) is an east–west Interstate Highway in the eastern United States. The highway runs from an interchange with I-81 near Middletown, Virginia, on its western end to an interchange with U.S. Route 29 (US 29) in Washington, D.C., at the eastern terminus. Much of the route parallels US 29 or State Route 55 (SR 55) in Virginia. I-66 has no physical or historical connection to the famous US 66, which was located in a different region of the United States.

The E Street Expressway is a spur from I-66 into the Foggy Bottom neighborhood of Washington, D.C.

Route description 

|-
|VA
|74.8
|120.54
|-
|DC
|1.6
|2.57
|-
|Total
|76.4
|123.11
|}

Virginia

Interstate 81 to Dunn Loring 
I-66 begins at a directional T interchange with I-81 near Middletown, Virginia. It heads east as a four-lane freeway and meets US 522/US 340 at a partial cloverleaf interchange. The two routes head south to Front Royal and north to Lake Frederick. I-66 continues east, paralleling SR 55 (John Marshall Highway) and meeting US 17 at a partial interchange with no access from southbound US 17 to westbound I-66. SR 55 also merges onto the freeway at this interchange, forming a three-way concurrency that ends near Marshall, with SR 55 leaving with U.S. Route 17 Business (US 17 Bus.) and US 17 leaving at the next exit.

Expanding to six lanes and continuing to parallel SR 55, I-66 enters the towns of Haymarket and Gainesville, reaching interchanges with US 15 (James Madison Highway) and US 29 (Lee Highway) in each town, respectively. The highway then heads to the south of the Manassas National Battlefield Park and to the north of the Bull Run Regional Park. The highway reaches another interchange with US 29 and passes to the north of Centreville and meets SR 28 (Sully Road) at an interchange with cloverleaf and stack elements to it. SR 28 heads north to Dulles International Airport and south to Manassas.

The freeway then meets SR 286 (Fairfax County Parkway), US 50 (Lee Jackson Memorial Highway), and SR 123 (Chain Bridge Road) at a series of interchanges providing access to D.C. suburbs. The Orange Line and Silver Line of the Washington Metro begin to operate in the median here, as the highway reaches a large interchange with the I-495 (Capital Beltway).

I-66 has a tolled high-occupancy vehicle lane (HO/T lane) from US 15 to the Capital Beltway.

Dunn Loring to Theodore Roosevelt Bridge 
The section of I-66 in Virginia east of the Capital Beltway is named the Custis Memorial Parkway, a toll road with variable tolls during peak hours. The road narrows to four lanes as it heads through affluent areas of Arlington. The parkway meets SR 7 (Leesburg Pike) at a full interchange. SR 267 (Dulles Toll Road) meets the parkway with an eastbound entrance and westbound exit. Continuing through neighborhoods, the route yet again meets US 29 at an incomplete interchange and continues east into Arlington, meeting SR 120 (Glebe Road) and continuing to Arlington County. It meets Spout Run Parkway and enters Rosslyn. The freeway turns southeast and runs in between US 29 as it approaches the Theodore Roosevelt Bridge, reaching another eastbound entrance and westbound exit as US 29 continues north on the Key Bridge. It then has a complex interchange with George Washington Parkway and SR 110 (Richmond Highway), providing access to Alexandria and the Pentagon, respectively. US 50 (Arlington Boulevard) merges onto the highway with a westbound exit and eastbound entrance and the two traverse the bridge.

The "Custis Memorial Parkway" name commemorates the Custis family, several of whose members (including Martha Dandridge Custis Washington, George Washington Parke Custis, Eleanor "Nelly" Parke Custis Lewis and Mary Anna Randolph Custis Lee) played prominent roles in Northern Virginia's history. Because of its terminus in the Shenandoah Valley, some early planning documents refer to I-66 as the "Shenandoah Freeway", although the name did not enter common use.

Between the Capital Beltway and the Theodore Roosevelt Bridge, the eastbound (inbound) roadway is a high-occupancy toll (HOT) road from 5:30 to 9:30 am, and the westbound (outbound) roadway is an HOT road from 3:00 to 7:00 pm. E-ZPass is required for all vehicles except motorcycles, including Dulles Airport users. I-66 is free during those times for HOV-3+ drivers with an E-ZPass Flex and for motorcycles. Other drivers must pay a toll that can be almost $50 at peak times. Outside of these hours, I-66 is free for all drivers to use.

District of Columbia 
In Washington, D.C., the route quickly turns north, separating from US 50. The highway interchanges with the E Street Expressway spur before passing beneath Virginia Avenue in a short tunnel. After an indirect interchange with the Rock Creek and Potomac Parkway (via 27th Street), the highway terminates at a pair of ramps leading to the Whitehurst Freeway (US 29) and L Street. The portion of Interstate 66 within Washington, DC, is known as the Potomac River Freeway.

E Street Expressway 

The E Street Expressway is a spur of I-66 that begins at an interchange with the Interstate just north of the Roosevelt Bridge. It proceeds east, has an interchange with Virginia Avenue Northwest, and terminates at 20th Street Northwest. From there, traffic continues along E Street Northwest to 17th Street Northwest near the White House, the Old Executive Office Building, the George Washington University, and the Corcoran Gallery of Art. Westbound traffic from 17th Street takes a one-block segment of New York Avenue to the expressway entrance at 20th and E streets northwest. The expressway and the connecting portions of E Street and New York Avenue are part of the National Highway System.

In 1963, the construction of the E Street Expressway caused the demolition of multiple buildings of the Old Naval Observatory.

Exit list
The entire route is in the Foggy Bottom neighborhood of Washington, D.C. All exits are unnumbered.

History

Virginia 

I-66 was first proposed in 1956 shortly after Congress established the Highway Trust Fund as a highway to connect Strasburg, Virginia, in the Shenandoah Valley with Washington.

During the planning stages, the Virginia Highway Department considered four possible locations for the highway inside the Beltway and, in 1959, settled on one that followed the Fairfax Drive–Bluemont Drive corridor between the Beltway and SR 120 (Glebe Road); and then the Washington and Old Dominion (W&OD) corridor between Glebe Road and Rosslyn in Arlington. The route west of 123 was determined earlier. Two other routes through Arlington neighborhoods and one along Arlington Boulevard were rejected due to cost or opposition. I-66 was originally to connect to the Three Sisters Bridge, but, as that bridge was canceled, it was later designed to connect to the Potomac River Freeway via the Theodore Roosevelt Bridge.

On December 16, 1961, the first piece of I-66, an  section from US 29 at Gainesville to US 29 at Centreville was opened. A disconnected  section near Delaplane in Fauquier County opened next in May 1962.

In July 1962, the highway department bought the Rosslyn Spur of the W&OD for $900,000 (equivalent to $ in ) and began clearing the way, such that, by 1965, all that remained was dirt and the shattered foundations of 200 homes cleared for the highway. In February 1965, the state contracted to buy  of the W&OD from Herndon to Alexandria for $3.5 million (equivalent to $ in ) and the C&O petitioned the ICC to let them abandon it. The purchase would eliminate the need to build a grade separation for I-66 and would provide  of right-of-way for the highway, saving the state millions. The abandonment proceedings took more than three years, as customers of the railway and transit advocates fought to keep the railroad open and delayed work on the highway. During that time, on November 10, 1967, the Washington Metropolitan Area Transit Authority (WMATA) announced that it had come to an agreement with the Highway Department that would give them a two-year option to buy a  stretch of the right-of-way from Glebe Road to the Beltway, where I-66 was to be built, and run mass transit on the median of it. The W&OD ran its last train during the summer of 1968, thus clearing the way for construction to begin in Arlington.

While the state waited on the W&OD, work continued elsewhere. The Theodore Roosevelt Bridge opened on June 23, 1964, and, in November of that year, the section from Centerville to the Beltway opened. A  extension from the Roosevelt Bridge to Rosslyn opened in October 1966.

After the Virginia Department of Transportation (VDOT; then known as the Virginia Department of Highways) took possession of the W&OD right-of-way in 1968, they began to run into opposition as the highway revolts of the late 1960s and early 1970s took hold. In 1970, the Arlington County Board requested new hearings, and opponents began to organize marches. A significant delay was encountered when the Arlington Coalition on Transportation (ACT) filed a lawsuit in Federal District Court in 1971 opposing the Arlington portion of the project. The group objected to that urban segment due to concerns over air quality, noise, unwanted traffic congestion, wasteful spending, impacts on mass transit, and wasted energy by auto travel. In 1972 the US Fourth Circuit Court of Appeals ruled in favor of ACT, technically blocking any construction. The US Supreme Court upheld the ruling in favor of ACT later that same year.

Again, work continued elsewhere, and, in October 1971, the  section from I-81 to US 340/US 522 north of Front Royal opened.

In July 1974, a final environmental impact statement (EIS) was submitted. The EIS proposed an eight-lane limited access expressway from the Capital Beltway to the area near Spout Run Parkway. Six lanes would branch off at the Parkway and cross the Potomac River via a proposed Three Sisters Bridge. Another six lanes would branch off to the Theodore Roosevelt Bridge. In November, a modified design was submitted, reducing the eight lanes to six. However, in 1975, VDOT disapproved the six-lane design.

The parties then agreed on experts to conduct air quality and noise studies for VDOT, selecting the firm of ESL Incorporated, the expert hired originally by ACT. In 1976, United States Secretary of Transportation William Thaddeus Coleman Jr. intervened. On January 4, 1977, Coleman approved federal aid for a much narrower, four-lane limited access highway between the Capital Beltway and the Theodore Roosevelt Bridge. As part of the deal, Virginia officials agreed to provide more than $100 million (equivalent to $ in ) in construction work and funds to help build the Metro system, which has tracks down the I-66 median to a station at Vienna in Fairfax County; to build a multiuse trail from Rosslyn to Falls Church; and to limit rush-hour traffic mainly to car pools. Three more lawsuits would follow, but work began on August 8, 1977, moments after US District Court Judge Owen R. Lewis denied an injunction sought by highway opponents.

In the late 1970s and early 1980s, the highway's final miles were built. A  section from Delaplane to US 17 east of Marshall was completed in two sections in 1978 and 1979. The  section from US 340 to Delaplane was completed in August 1979. A  section between US 17 in Marshall and US 15 in Haymarket opened in December 1979, with the gap between Haymarket and Gainesville closed on December 19, 1980. On December 22, 1982, the final section of I-66 opened between the Capital Beltway and US 29 (Lee Highway) in Rosslyn, near the Virginia end of the Theodore Roosevelt Bridge.

The Custis Trail, the trail along I-66 built between Rosslyn and Falls Church as a concession, opened in the summer of 1982, before the highway was complete. SR 267 (Dulles Access Road) between I-66 and the airport opened in 1984. The Metrorail in the median of I-66 between Ballston and Vienna, another concession, opened on June 7, 1986.

After opening, the restrictions on use began to loosen. In 1983, Virginia dropped the HOV requirement from 4 to 3 and then from 3 to 2 in 1994. In 1992, motorcycles were allowed.

On October 9, 1999, Public Law 106-69 transferred from the federal government to the Commonwealth of Virginia the authority for the operation, maintenance, and construction of I-66 between Rosslyn and the Capital Beltway.

Because I-66 is the only Interstate Highway traveling west from Washington, D.C., into Northern Virginia, traffic on the road is often extremely heavy. For decades, there has been talk of widening I-66 from two to three lanes each way inside the Capital Beltway (I-495) through Arlington County, Virginia, although many Arlington residents are adamantly opposed to this plan. In 2004–2005, Virginia studied options for widening the highway inside the Beltway, including the prospect of implementing a one-lane-plus-shoulder extension on westbound I-66 within the Beltway (in an attempt to reduce congestion for people commuting away from D.C.). They later settled on three planned "spot improvements" meant to ease traffic congestion on westbound I-66 inside the Capital Beltway. The first "improvement", a  zone between Fairfax Drive and Sycamore Street, started in summer 2010 and was finished in December 2011. For this project, the entrance ramp acceleration lane and the exit ramp deceleration lanes were lengthened to form a continuous lane between both ramps. The  shoulder lane can carry emergency vehicles and can be used in emergency situations. The second one widened  between the Washington Boulevard onramp and the ramp to the Dulles Access Road. Work on it began in 2013 and finished in 2015. The third project, between Lee Highway/Spout Run and Glebe Road, is scheduled for completion in 2020.

In Gainesville, Virginia, the Gainesville Interchange Project upgraded the interchange between US 29 and I-66 for those and many other roads due to rapid development and accompanying heavy traffic in the Gainesville and Haymarket area. I-66's overpasses were reconstructed to accommodate nine lanes (six general purpose, two HOV, and one collector–distributor eastbound) and lengthened for the expansion of US 29 to six lanes. These alterations were completed in June 2010. In 2014–2015, US 29 was largely grade-separated in the area, including an interchange at its current intersection with SR 619 (Linton Hall Road). The project began in 2004 and finished in 2015.

In 2015, the VDOT Transportation planning board added I-66 HOT lanes to their list of priority projects for the I-66 corridor. The projects have sparked opposition between residents and community businesses over the direction of this region's future infrastructure planning. The VDOT established a "Transform 66" website on regional traffic issues. Residents living within the I-66 corridor have set up "Transform 66 Wisely", a website describing local community impacts that the VDOT projects may cause. In contrast, local business groups and Chambers of Commerce located near the affected areas have voiced support for transportation improvements in the I-66 region.

Residents along the I-66 corridor, such as in Arlington County, have resisted I-66 widening proposals for many years. The local Stenwood Elementary School would lose its attached field, leaving it with blacktop-only recess space. In an April 16, 2015, letter to the Virginia Secretary of Transportation, members of the 1st, 8th, 10th, and 11th districts of Congress wrote that VDOT research noted that, during peak hours, 35 percent of eastbound cars and 50 percent of westbound cars are HOV violators.

Future federal steps for VDOT include National Environmental Policy Act (NEPA) review, obligation of federal funds, certification that the conversion to tolled facilities will not "degrade" the existing facility, and potential federal loan guarantee. The Virginia Commonwealth Transportation Board (CTB) is responsible for overseeing VDOT and allocating highway funding to specific projects. The board has 18 members appointed by the Governor, includes the Virginia Secretary of Transportation, Aubrey Layne, and is the group that will be making the final decision and allocating funding for VDOT's plans for I-66.

In 2016, VDOT announced that it was planning to add express lanes and multimodal transportation improvements to I-66 outside the Beltway (the "Transform 66 Outside the Beltway" improvement project). A decision was also made to move forward with widening I-66 eastbound and make multimodal improvements from the Dulles Airport connector to Ballston (the "Transform 66 Inside the Beltway" improvement project).

VDOT also announced during 2016 that it would initiate on I-66 a dynamic tolling system in the peak travel directions during rush hours. On December 4, 2017, VDOT converted  of I-66 between US 29 in Rosslyn and the Capital Beltway to an HOV variable congestion pricing tolling system. The system permits solo drivers to use I-66 during peak travel hours in the appropriate direction if they pay a toll.

Carpools and vanpools (with three or more people), transit, on-duty law enforcement and first responders will not pay a toll. Prices ranged up to $47 for solo drivers, but the average speed during the morning rush hour was  versus  a year before.

In 2017, construction began on the "Transform 66 Outside the Beltway" improvement project. The project will add  of new dynamically-tolled express lanes alongside I-66 from I-495 to University Boulevard in Gainesville. VDOT expects the project to be completed in December 2022.

Construction on widening eastbound I-66 as part of the "Transform 66 Inside the Beltway" improvement project began in June 2018 and is expected to be completed in 2020. The project will add a travel lane on eastbound I-66 between the Dulles Access Road and Fairfax Drive (exit 71) in Ballston, will provide a new ramp-to-ramp direct access connection from eastbound I-66 to the West Falls Church station at the SR 7 interchange and will provide a new bridge for the W&OD Trail over US 29.

VDOT completed in August 2018 a diverging diamond interchange in Haymarket at the interchange of I-66 with US 15.

District of Columbia 

In Washington D.C., I-66 was planned to extend east of its current terminus along the North Leg of the Inner Loop freeway. I-66 would have also met the eastern terminus of the planned I-266 at US 29, and the western terminus of I-695 (South Leg Freeway) at US 50; I-266 would have been a parallel route to I-66, providing more direct access to the North Leg from points west, while I-695 would have been an inner-city connector between I-66 and I-95.

The final plans for the North Leg Freeway, as published in 1971, outlined a  six-lane tunnel beneath K Street, between I-266/US 29 and New York Avenue, where the North Leg would emerge from the tunnel and join with the Center Leg Freeway (formerly I-95, now I-395); the two routes would run concurrently for  before reaching the Union Station interchange, where I-66 was planned to terminate. Despite the plan to route the North Leg in a tunnel beneath K Street, the intense opposition to previous, scrapped alignments for the D.C. freeway network, which included previous alignments for the North Leg Freeway, led to the mass cancelation of all unbuilt D.C. freeways in 1977, resulting in the truncation of I-66 at US 29.

Exit list 
All exits in the District of Columbia are unnumbered.

Auxiliary routes 

Interstate 266 (I-266) was a proposed loop route of I-66 between Washington, D.C., and Arlington County, Virginia. D.C. officials proposed designating the route Interstate 66N, a move opposed by AASHTO. In Virginia, I-266 would have split off from I-66 just east of the present SR 124 (Spout Run Parkway) exit. From there, it would have followed an expanded Spout Run Parkway, crossed the George Washington Memorial Parkway, and crossed the Potomac River across a new bridge that would have been called the Three Sisters Bridge. Upon entering D.C., it would have followed Canal Road and an expanded US 29 (Whitehurst Freeway) to rejoin I/66 at K Street. I-266 was canceled in 1972 in the face of community opposition during Washington's "freeway revolts".

Transform 66 
The Virginia Department of Transportation announced its public-private partnership with the Virginia Department of Rail and Public Transportation, and the private partner, I-66 Express Mobility Partners, with an estimating $3.7 billion dollars for transportation/road improvements along the I-66 corridor. The project, known as Transform 66, opened to traffic in November 2022 and the HOV rule changed from HOV-2+ to HOV-3+ in early December 2022.

References

External links 

 Transform 66 Outside the Beltway Project
 HOV schedule in Northern Virginia, from Virginia Dept. of Transportation
 Steve Anderson's DCRoads.net: Interstate 66 (Virginia)

 
66
66
Transportation in Frederick County, Virginia
Transportation in Warren County, Virginia
Transportation in Fauquier County, Virginia
Transportation in Prince William County, Virginia
Transportation in Fairfax County, Virginia
Transportation in Arlington County, Virginia
66